GSP Jupiter is a semi-submersible, jackup independent leg cantilever drilling rig operated by GSP Drilling, a Grup Servicii Petroliere subsidiary, and currently laid up in the port of Limassol.

Description
GSP Jupiter drilling rig was designed by Sonnat Offshore and was built by Petrom at the Galaţi Shipyard in 1987. The rig was completely reconstructed and refurbished in 2007 at a cost of US$55 million. The rig was owned and operated by Petrom from 1987 to 2005 when the company sold its six offshore platforms (including Atlas, Jupiter, Orizont, Prometeu and Saturn) to Grup Servicii Petroliere for US$100 million.

As a drilling rig, GSP Jupiter is equipped with advanced drilling equipment and has to meet strict levels of certification under international law. GSP Jupiter is able to maneuver with its own engines (to counter drift and ocean currents), but for long-distance relocation it must be moved by specialist tugboats. The rig is capable of withstanding severe sea conditions including  waves and  winds.

Operations
Currently the GSP Jupiter is operated by the British company Melrose Resources which uses the drilling rig at its Black Sea oil and natural gas prospects. On 19 May 2010 the GSP Jupiter started a drilling program at the Kaliakra East gas field which is thought to have 59 bcft of natural gas. After finishing this program the rig will be moved to the Kavarna East gas field.

References

1987 ships
Jack-up rigs
Semi-submersibles
Ships built in Romania